Lake is a large village and civil parish located on Sandown Bay, on the Isle of Wight, England.

Name
Lake is named after the Old English "Lacu" referring to the creek that ran along, and has been artificially widened into what is now Scotchells Brook, which is between the Isle of Wight Airport, the Morrisons Superstore and the Spithead Industrial Park.

History
The high street that runs through Lake has not changed much since the early 20th century. However, the village war memorial, constructed in 1920, has been relocated behind the Fairway Bus Shelter due to having been run down twice by carelessly driven lorries. The thatched cottage at Merrie Gardens dates from the 17th century and is the oldest surviving building in Lake.

Geography

Lake's beach or 'Welcome Beach' has golden sands and reached by a steep path down the sandstone cliffs to the Revetment. It has two cafes (Hinks and Strollers), beach huts, a Sea Scout hut and inshore lifeboat.

A large public park called Los Altos starts at the boundary between Lake and Sandown. Another large park called Lake Cliff Gardens borders the cliffs that back onto the beach and stretches between Lake and Shanklin.

Local wildlife includes Pipistrelle bats at Los Altos, kestrels along the Cliff Path and Common Toads which spawn in the disused reservoir behind the Mall. The wetlands of the River Yar are an SSSI supporting newts, voles and wildfowl.

Facilities

The village has the Broadlea primary school at Blackpan and The Bay School (Church of England primary and secondary) at the north end of the Fairway. There are several pubs including The Stag, plus The Porter Club (formerly Lake Working Men's Club) and a Town Guild.

Local businesses include Downer & White undertakers, Swinton Insurance, Allegri accountants, RSPCA charity shop and a veterinary practice. The village also features an Indian and Chinese Restaurant plus two Chinese takeaways, a kebab shop and Lake Fish Bar. There is a doctor's surgery and pharmacy. The disused medical clinic at the corner of Lake Hill and the Fairway is now a Co-Operative funeral parlour.

There were recently two pubs in the village - The Stag and the Manor House. The Manor House was closed and has since reopened as a Tesco Metro. However, another pub, "The Merrie Garden" has recently opened near the Morrison's store. Alongside The Merrie Garden pub, a new Premier Inn has recently been built. It opened in late 2015. A branch of KFC opened in December 2018 nearby.

Sandown & Shanklin Golf Course is behind the Academy School and the Rugby Club in front.

Religion

The village has a Methodist Church which was opened in 1956 and upgraded from 2009 to 2011 with the addition of a church hall. The old church, built in 1877, complete with a hall and schoolroom (added in 1923) is now a multi-purpose building with both halls being converted into housing.

The Anglican Church of the Good Shepherd, which was constructed designed in 1892, is also in the village. Construction finished in May 1894 and it replaced the  former Little Iron Church of 1876.

There also is a Kingdom Hall of Jehovah's Witnesses.

Transportation
Public transport is provided by Southern Vectis bus routes 2, 3 and 8 - which run between Newport, Ryde, Sandown, Shanklin, Ventnor and Bembridge. Night buses operate on Friday and Saturday nights.

Having opened in 1987, Lake railway station was the newest on the island until the construction of a station at Smallbrook Junction in 1994. The station is placed in the heart of a quiet residential area close to Lake Cliff Gardens.

References

External links 
Some current photographs
Historical photographs of Lake from the Francis Frith collection
Hilton Price's Nostalgic Lake

Villages on the Isle of Wight
Civil parishes in the Isle of Wight